LOT-EK is an architectural design studio based in New York and Naples, Italy. Founded in 1993 by Ada Tolla and Giuseppe Lignano, it has designed institutional, commercial and residential projects globally. In addition, LOT-EK has conceived and executed exhibition design and site-specific installations for several cultural institutions and museums, including the Whitney Museum of American Art, Museum of Modern Art (MoMA), Walker Canter, among others.  Their projects have been widely published and exhibited.

In December 2011, Ada and Giuseppe were recognized as USA Booth Fellows of Architecture & Design by United States Artists.

Upcycling & sustainable architecture 

As a studio, LOT-EK is committed to ecologically responsible and intelligent methods of building.  They have built a critical architectural practice through research into the adaptive reuse (“upcycling”) of infrastructural and industrial objects — most notably the standard 40-foot shipping container.  They are recognized for initiating the concept of creating architecture with shipping containers and has successfully leveraged this construction technology with several award-winning projects.

In addition to utilizing containers as building blocks for architecture, LOT-EK has upcycled other objects – including truck bodies, airplane fuselages, and reclaimed wood or steel doors – as structural interventions to design buildings and interiors.  Their stated goal is to not only recycle an object, but to recycle the intelligence that went into the object’s development.

LOT-EK’s ongoing research has focused on man-made objects and systems and the way they proliferate, accumulate, overlap and interfere with the built, and natural, environment around the globe.  The manufactured objects that interest them include: air-conditioners, airplanes, antennas, billboards, highways, jetways, and tunnels; boats, booths, boxes, coils, cranes, ducts, lifts, lights, strips, scraps, stacks, shacks, sheds, and trucks; packaging, parking, plumbing, scaffolding, shipping containers and tanks.

History 

Ada and Giuseppe traveled extensively throughout the United States upon finishing architecture studies in Italy. Inspired by the American landscape – both natural and urban – they won a scholarship to conduct post-graduate work at Columbia University.  This allowed them to experience both the experimental academic environment of Columbia, as well as the urban complexity of New York City.  The work they produced during that year was compiled in a book, which served as the foundation of the primary idea behind LOT-EK as a design studio.

After successfully submitting their dissertation in Italy, Ada and Giuseppe founded a studio in Naples.  On the basis of their work, as well as introductions during their time at Columbia, Ada and Giuseppe began receiving commissions in the US.  In 1995, they decided to open another studio in New York City, and secured a loft in the then raw and unglamorous Meat Packing District.  This further established their practice as a hands-on, artistic investigation into the creative reclaiming of the industrial and man-made.

Principals 

Ada Tolla and Giuseppe Lignano each have a master's degree in Architecture and Urban Design from the Universita’ di Napoli, Italy (1989), and have completed post-graduate studies at Columbia University, New York (1990-1991). In addition to heading LOT-EK, they currently teach at Columbia University, Graduate School of Architecture, Planning and Preservation in New York, and the Massachusetts Institute of Technology’s Graduate Department of Architecture, in Cambridge, Massachusetts.

They also lecture at universities and cultural institutions in the US and abroad, and have presented at  conferences and meetings about sustainability and the built environment, including the Holcim Forum on Sustainability 2010 (Mexico City), and the Kyoto Institute of Technology (Kyoto, Japan), among others.

Publications 
 LOT-EK: UPCYCLE, 2012. 
 MDU Mobile Dwelling Unit, DAP, 2003.  
 Urbanscan, Princeton Architectural Press, 2002.  
 LOT-EK Mixer, Edizioni Press, 2000.

Notable works 

 Whitney Studio (Whitney Museum of American Art, New York City)
 APAP OpenSchool (Anyang, Korea)
 Puma City (Multiple global ports; planned installation in Boston, MA)
 Sanlitun North (Beijing, China)
 Sanlitun South (Beijing, China)
 Weiner Residence (New York City)
 Russell-Fontanez Residence (New York City)
 Pier 57 (Winning RFP design; in-progress; planned completion in 2014)
 Carroll House (in-progress; planned completion in 2013)
 Mobile Dwelling Unit or MDU (Multiple locations in the US)

References

External links 
 

Architecture firms based in New York City
Architecture firms of Italy
Companies established in 1993